José Luis Villar Palasí (30 September 1922 – 7 May 2012) was a Spanish politician who served as Minister of Education and Science of Spain between 1968 and 1973, during the Francoist dictatorship.

References

1922 births
2012 deaths
Education ministers of Spain
Government ministers during the Francoist dictatorship